NGC 6412 is a spiral galaxy located in the constellation Draco. It is designated as SBc in the galaxy morphological classification scheme and was discovered by the British astronomer William Herschel on 12 December 1797. NGC 6412 is located at about 76.6Mly away from Earth.

See also 
 List of NGC objects (6001–7000)
 List of NGC objects

References

External links 
 

Barred spiral galaxies
Draco (constellation)
6412
10897
060393